Chung Ling (N.T.) High School Butterworth (Cluster School of Excellence) is a secondary school in Malaysia. The Butterworth branch of Penang Chung Ling High School was established in the year of 1986 under the initiative of its Directors Board. Following the footsteps of the main school, Chung Ling Butterworth only accepts students with good grades in their Standard Six Examination (UPSR). 

Chung Ling High School Butterworth is one of the handful of schools that conform to the government's policy of 60-40.

History

Location
The school is located in Butterworth, Penang, near Jalan Ong Yi How.

References

External links
 School website

Secondary schools in Malaysia
Chinese-language schools in Malaysia
Publicly funded schools in Malaysia
Schools in Penang